The 1903–04 United States collegiate men's ice hockey season was the 10th season of collegiate ice hockey.

Regular season

Standings

References

1903–04 NCAA Standings

External links
College Hockey Historical Archives

 
College